Parnassos is a former municipality in Phocis, Greece, named after Mount Parnassus. Since the 2011 local government reform it is part of the municipality Delphi, of which it is a municipal unit. The municipal unit has an area of 87.033 km2. Population 1,968 (2011). The seat of the municipality was in Polydrosos.

References

Populated places in Phocis
Mount Parnassus